This is a list of islands of Haiti.  Most of The Republic of Haiti is situated on the western portion of Hispaniola, an island which it shares with the Dominican Republic. There are approximately 59 islands in Haiti making it one of the sovereign countries with the most island in the Caribbean.  The islands are either in the Atlantic Ocean , Gulf of Gonave or Caribbean Sea (see map link).  La Navase is disputed between Haiti and the US. Ilet a Brouee is the most densely populated island in the world with up to 500 people sharing an area of just .

Islands
Haitian islands include:
Caye Baice, 
Caye de l'Est, 
Caye Orange, 
Caye Ramier, 
Caye Sable, 
Gonâve Island, 
Grosse Caye, 
Hispaniola, 
Île de Anacaona
Île Bayau, 
Îlet Boyer, 
Île à Cabrits, 
Île Corny, 
Île du Nord (Ti Teal)
Île Petite Gonâve
Île du Phare (Lighthouse Island)
Île Picoulet, 
Île Pleermantois, 
Île du Sud
Île-à-Vache (Cow Island), 
Ilet a Brouee, 
Îlet Limbé, 
Îlet Moustique, 
Îlet Rémy, 
Îlet Saint-Louis, 
Îlot du Fort, 
Isle Cacique, 
Les Cayemites
Grand Cayemite, 
Petite Cayemite, 
Navassa Island (claimed by both Haiti and the United States), 
Petite Caye, 
Tortuga Island (Turtle Island), 
La Trompeuse,

See also
List of Caribbean islands

References

Islands
Haiti